On December 18, 2011, 23-year-old Phoenix Coldon left her family home in Spanish Lake, Missouri and disappeared. Her parents have raised criticism about the conduct of local law enforcement, and spent their money and home following leads.

Biography 
Phoenix Coldon is the daughter of Goldia and Lawrence Coldon. Coldon was born in California as Phoenix Reeves and raised there until the family moved for her father's job to Missouri, where she was adopted by Lawrence Coldon. Phoenix was mostly home-schooled and played a variety of musical instruments and was the local junior fencing champion.

Disappearance 
Coldon disappeared on December 18, 2011, after leaving her family home in a black 1998 Chevy Blazer at about 3 PM local time. Her father told reporters that she was supposedly headed to a convenience store around the street or possibly a friend's house. Hours after she disappeared, her vehicle was discovered at 5:27 PM and impounded at 6:23 PM, abandoned (initially reported to still be running, which was later proven inaccurate), 25 minutes from her home, on St. Clair Avenue of East St. Louis. The vehicle was entered into the police database as abandoned; the vehicle was not initially discovered as abandoned when investigated by Missouri police as it was impounded in Illinois. The family was reportedly not notified of the car being discovered until a family friend searching independently discovered it in a tow lot. Upon an independent search by her family afterwards, the vehicle was discovered to still contain her glasses, purse, shoes, ID and a cell phone bill that had been sent to collections.

After her disappearance, all activity on her bank accounts, cell phone and social media accounts ceased. DNA evidence gathered from her SUV indicated that there were no other individuals in the vehicle other than Coldon and her parents.

Search efforts 
Her parents have independently searched for Coldon after raising allegations of a lack of effort from local police. Through the years, they have talked to local drug dealers and sex workers for information and hired a private investigator. Privately funding the search caused the family home to go into foreclosure and for the family's life savings to be drained.

A two-night special television documentary on her disappearance debuted on Oxygen on November 3 and 4, 2018, in which investigative reporter Shawndrea Thomas and retired deputy Police Chief Joe Delia discussed theories on her disappearance.

In 2016, her case was profiled on the podcast The Vanished.

In 2023, her case was profiled on the podcast Crime Junkie.

See also
Disappearance of Stacey English, a similar case in Atlanta, Georgia.
List of people who disappeared
Other people still missing, for whom discovery of their abandoned car preceded being reported as a missing person

References 

2010s missing person cases
2011 in Missouri
December 2011 events in the United States
Missing person cases in Missouri
St. Louis County, Missouri
History of women in Missouri